Nizhnyaya Vodyanka is a rural locality (a selo) in Verkhnevodyanskoye Rural Settlement, Staropoltavsky District, Volgograd Oblast, Russia. The population was 15 as of 2010. There are 3 streets.

Geography 
Nizhnyaya Vodyanka is located in steppe, on Transvolga, on the right bank of the Vodyanka River, 55 km southeast of Staraya Poltavka (the district's administrative centre) by road. Verkhnyaya Vodyanka is the nearest rural locality.

References 

Rural localities in Staropoltavsky District